This is a list of nations, as represented by National Paralympic Committees (NPCs), that have participated in the Summer Paralympic Games between 1960 and 2020. As of the 2020 Games, all of the current 170 NPCs have participated in at least one edition of the Paralympic Games, and athletes from Argentina, Australia, Austria, France, Great Britain, Israel, Italy, Sweden, Switzerland and United States have competed in all fifteen Summer Paralympic Games.

List of nations

Table legend

Alphabetical list

References

Paralympics-related lists